Undercurrents, 'the magazine of alternative science and technology', was published in England between 1972 and 1984: when it was merged into Resurgence: 63 editions all together.

In the 1970s, Clifford Harper provided illustrations. For much of that period it appeared every two months and the circulation peaked at 7,000 in the late 1970s. It became the ‘house journal of the alternative technology movement’. The magazine has been republished on the World Wide Web using Issuu and, in part only, on Scribd.

References

External links
 The Undercurrents Archive 1972 - 1984
 Undercurrents on Scribd
 Centre for Alternative Technology

Bi-monthly magazines published in the United Kingdom
Defunct magazines published in the United Kingdom
Magazines published in London
Magazines established in 1972
Magazines disestablished in 1984
Science and technology magazines published in the United Kingdom